George Stuart Atkins  (1917 – November 30, 2009) was a Canadian broadcaster, a CBC Television and Radio host, and the founder of Farm Radio International.

Interviews

Interview with George Atkins at Communication for Social Change Consortium

References

1917 births
2009 deaths
University of Guelph alumni
Members of the Order of Canada
American emigrants to Canada